A Long Drink of the Blues is a studio album by saxophonist Jackie McLean. It was recorded in 1957, and released in 1961 on New Jazz Records as NJ 8253. It features two tracks with McLean in a sextet featuring trumpeter Webster Young, trombonist Curtis Fuller, bassist Paul Chambers and drummer Louis Hayes, and three with a quartet featuring pianist Mal Waldron, bassist Art Phipps and drummer Art Taylor.

Reception

The contemporaneous DownBeat reviewer picked "These Foolish Things" as the highlight, stating that McLean's playing of the bridge in his two solo choruses varied effectively, giving "a different emotional experience to the listener".

Track listing 
"A Long Drink of the Blues" [Take 1] false start - 2:21
"A Long Drink of the Blues" (McLean) [Take 2] - 20:49
"Embraceable You" (Gershwin, Gershwin) - 7:07
"I Cover the Waterfront" (Heyman, Green) - 6:27
"These Foolish Things (Remind Me of You)" (Link, Marvell, Strachey) - 8:21

Personnel
Jackie McLean - alto and tenor sax (1-2) alto sax (3-5)
Webster Young - trumpet (1-2)
Curtis Fuller - trombone (1-2)
Gil Coggins (1-2), Mal Waldron (3-5) - piano
Paul Chambers (1-2), Arthur Phipps (3-5) - bass
Louis Hayes (1-2), Art Taylor (3-5) - drums

References 

1961 albums
Jackie McLean albums
Albums produced by Bob Weinstock
New Jazz Records albums